The Assistant is a 1998 drama film directed by Daniel Petrie and starring Gil Bellows, Armin Mueller-Stahl, Joan Plowright, and Kate Greenhouse. It is based on the 1957 novel of the same name by Bernard Malamud and was also the final theatrical film directed by Petrie before his death in 2004. It follows a young man who finds work at a shop at the turn-of-the-century, and falls in love with the owner's daughter, inflaming deeply religious origins. Filming took place in Toronto.

Cast
 Gil Bellows as Frank Alpine
 Armin Mueller-Stahl as Morris Bober
 Joan Plowright as Ida Bober
 Jaimz Woolvett as Ward Minogue
 Frank Moore as Detective Minogue

External links

1998 films
1998 drama films
English-language Canadian films
Films based on American novels
Films directed by Daniel Petrie
Canadian drama films
1990s English-language films
1990s Canadian films
English-language drama films